The AutoPro Plaque was awarded annually to the player with the best plus/minus total in the Quebec Major Junior Hockey League. The award was initiated in 1989–90, then known as the Transamerica Plaque, and discontinued in 2001–02.

Winners

External links
 QMJHL official site List of trophy winners.

Quebec Major Junior Hockey League trophies and awards
Awards established in 1990
Awards disestablished in 2001